HMS Forte was an  of the Royal Navy launched on 9 December 1893. She was constructed under the Naval Defence Act of 1889 along with several other Astraea-class cruisers. Forte was eventually decommissioned in 1913.

History

HMS Forte served on the Cape and West African stations. She visited Sierra Leone and The Gambia in early January 1901. In December 1902 she was reported to be in East Africa, when she took the British colonial secretary Joseph Chamberlain and his wife from Mombasa to Zanzibar during their tour of British colonies.

In 1908, the ship delivered such a terrible result in a gunlayer's test that a Court of Inquiry was convened, leading to the determination that Captain John Green and his officers had failed to provide sufficient training, as they had not appreciated the difficulty of the test procedure. In 1910 Green ran the cruiser aground, eliciting Their Lordships "severe displeasure for failure to comply with King's Regulations for unseamanlike manner in which the ship was navigated."

Disposal 
In 1913 Forte was placed on the sale list and sold on 2 April 1914 for scrapping. She was the only ship of her class not to see service in the First World War.

References 
 

 

Astraea-class cruisers
Ships built in Chatham
1893 ships